The Gates Avenue station is a local station on the elevated BMT Jamaica Line of the New York City Subway, located at the intersection of Gates Avenue and Broadway at the border of Bedford–Stuyvesant and Bushwick, Brooklyn. It is served by the Z train during rush hours in the peak direction and by the J train at all other times.

History

Gates Avenue is the oldest station in the subway system to have been built as a rapid transit station; it has been serving BMT trains for approximately  years. While Far Rockaway–Mott Avenue is the oldest station currently in operation in the New York City Subway system, having originally opened in 1869 as a Long Island Rail Road station, that station had an 8-year disruption in service while being converted to subway loading gauge, meaning that Gates Avenue is the system's oldest station in continuous operation.

Gates Avenue was originally opened by the Union Elevated Railroad on May 13, 1885 for the BMT Lexington Avenue Line, and has been in continuous operation since then. The BMT Jamaica Line connected to the station on June 25, 1888. Prior to the Dual Contracts, trains either operated down Broadway to Broadway Ferry (which closed upon the opening of the Williamsburg Bridge tracks to Essex Street) or Lexington Avenue, eventually merging onto the Myrtle Avenue El. The Dual Contracts expanded the BMT Jamaica Line, including Gates Avenue, to three tracks, allowing for express service, as well as expanding service in Manhattan down Nassau Street. In 1950, the Lexington Avenue El closed, resulting in the redirection of all trains to the Williamsburg Bridge.

Station layout

This station has two side platforms and three tracks with the center express track not normally used. Each platform has beige windscreens and red canopies (both with green frames) that run along the entire length except for a small section at both ends.

The 2002 artwork here is called Dream Train by Chris Robinson and features mass transit-related stained glass windows in the station house and the windscreens.

South of this station, the BMT Jamaica Line connected to the BMT Lexington Avenue Line before it ceased operation on October 13, 1950 and some remains are visible. The next stop on the Lexington Avenue El was Reid Avenue on its way to Downtown Brooklyn and Park Row, Manhattan.

Exits
The station has exits on both the west (railroad north) end and the east (railroad south) end of its platforms. Despite the station's name, there is no longer an open exit to Gates Avenue.

On the west end, each platform has a single staircase leading to an elevated station house beneath the tracks. It has a turnstile bank and token booth. Outside fare control, two staircases lead to both eastern corners of Quincy Street and Broadway.

The eastern exits are now emergency exits leading to both western corners of Palmetto Street and Broadway, just east of Gates Avenue. These exits were closed in the 1980s due to high crime. There is a closed station house around the intermediate level of the staircases.

References

External links 

 
 Station Reporter — J train
 The Subway Nut — Gates Avenue Pictures 
 MTA's Arts For Transit — Gates Avenue (BMT Jamaica Line)
 Quincy Street entrance from Google Maps Street View
Platforms from Google Maps Street View
 Gates Avenue Tower at Broadway Elevated Junction: Lexington Avenue Line (BMT) (New York Transit Museum; Flickr)

BMT Jamaica Line stations
1885 establishments in New York (state)
BMT Lexington Avenue Line stations
New York City Subway stations in Brooklyn
Railway stations in the United States opened in 1885
Bushwick, Brooklyn
Bedford–Stuyvesant, Brooklyn